Andrew Charles Schiffler (August 10, 1889 – March 27, 1970) was a Republican United States Representative and attorney from West Virginia. He was born in Wheeling. He served in the Seventy-sixth Congress (January 3, 1939 – January 3, 1941); and the Seventy-eighth Congress (January 3, 1943 – January 3, 1945). He died March 27, 1970.

After graduating from the public schools, he studied law in Wheeling law offices. In 1913, he was admitted to the bar and entered legal practice in Wheeling. He served as a bankruptcy referee for the northern district of West Virginia from 1918 to 1922. From 1925 until 1932, he served as prosecuting attorney for Ohio County. He was Ohio County Republican Committee Chairman from 1936 to 1938. He was first elected to the U.S. House in 1938. His candidacy for re-election in 1940 was unsuccessful. He returned to the House after winning the 1942 election. After his unsuccessful re-election attempt in 1944, he returned to his law practice. He remained an active attorney until his death in Wheeling on March 27, 1970. He was buried  in Mount Calvary Cemetery.

See also
United States congressional delegations from West Virginia

Sources

SCHIFFLER, Andrew Charles, (1889 - 1970) Online. September 9, 2007.
SEVENTY-SIXTH CONGRESS (pdf). Online. September 9, 2007.
SEVENTY-EIGHTH CONGRESS (pdf) Online. September 9, 2007.

1889 births
1970 deaths
County prosecuting attorneys in West Virginia
Politicians from Wheeling, West Virginia
West Virginia lawyers
Republican Party members of the United States House of Representatives from West Virginia
20th-century American politicians
Lawyers from Wheeling, West Virginia
20th-century American lawyers